Maj Gen Deon Holtzhausen  was a General Officer in the South African Army and General Officer Commanding the South African Army Artillery Formation. and later the Chief of Army Force Structure on the staff on the Chief of the Army.

Military career 
He joined the defence force in 1976. He was commissioned as an officer and subsequently served as Battery Commander at 14 Field Regiment, unit Second in Command, OC 14 Artillery Regiment, 2IC 10 Artillery Brigade, OC 4 Artillery Regiment. He completed the Joint Services Staff College course in 1998. He was a staff officer in the Army Headquarters in 1998-2001. He did a stint as a Defence Advisor to the Kingdom of Saudi Arabia until 2011. He was promoted to Brigadier General on 1 November 2011 and appointed as GOC SA Army Artillery Formation.

Subsequently promoted to Major General and appointed as the Chief Director Army Force Structures in January 2016. He went on pension in February 2018.

Honours and awards

Medals

Proficiency badges

References 

South African Army generals
South African military officers
Living people
1958 births
Military attachés
 Alumni of King's College London
Graduates of the Joint Services Command and Staff College